Andrea Jenkins (born May 10, 1961) is an American politician, writer, performance artist, poet, and transgender activist. She is known for being the first Black openly transgender woman elected to public office in the United States, since January 2018 on the Minneapolis City Council and as the council's president, since January 2022.

Jenkins moved to Minnesota to attend the University of Minnesota in 1979 and was hired by the Hennepin County government, where she worked for a decade. Jenkins worked as a staff member on the Minneapolis City Council for 12 years before beginning work as curator of the Transgender Oral History Project at the University of Minnesota's Jean-Nickolaus Tretter Collection in Gay, Lesbian, Bisexual and Transgender Studies.

Early life and education
Born in 1961, Andrea Jenkins was raised in North Lawndale, Chicago. She has said she grew up in "a low-income, working-class community" and "lived in some pretty rough places." She was raised by a single mother, Shirley Green, who was "very loving and very much concerned that we get a good education."

When she was young and still presenting as male, she participated in the Cub Scouts and played football at Robert Lindblom Math & Science Academy before moving to Minneapolis in 1979 to attend the University of Minnesota.

In her 20s, Jenkins came out as gay, married a woman, became a parent, and divorced. At 30, she began to outwardly present as female and returned to college to finish her bachelor's degree from Metropolitan State University, which she followed by earning two master's degrees–an MFA in creative writing from Hamline University and an MS in community economic development from Southern New Hampshire University. During which, Jenkins worked as a vocational counselor for the Hennepin County government. In 2018, Jenkins completed Harvard University's John F. Kennedy School of Government program for Senior Executives in State and Local Government as a David Bohnett LGBTQ Victory Institute Leadership fellow.

Career

Local government
Jenkins worked for a decade as a vocational counselor with Hennepin County. In 2001, Robert Lilligren, who was running for a seat on the Minneapolis City Council, asked Jenkins to be a part of his campaign. After his election, Jenkins joined Lilligren's staff where she worked as an aide for four years.

In 2005, Elizabeth Glidden was elected to the City Council and hired Jenkins as an aide, in part for Jenkins's extensive network that she had built up during her time in Lilligren's office. While on Glidden's staff, Jenkins earned a fellowship dedicated to transgender issues and helped to establish the Transgender Issues Work Group in 2014. That year, she organized a City Council summit on transgender equity intended to highlight the issues trans people in Minnesota face.

In 2015, after 12 years as a policy aide with the Minneapolis City Council, Jenkins began work at the University of Minnesota's Jean-Nickolaus Tretter Collection in Gay, Lesbian, Bisexual and Transgender Studies where she curates the Transgender Oral History Project (TOHP). Lisa Vecoli, curator of the Tretter Collection, noted that the materials within the collection tend to be gay white male-focused. In her role as curator of the TOHP, Jenkins will seek to expand the trans narratives archived in the collection by recording oral histories from up to 300 individuals, totaling as many as 400 hours of interviews.

Minneapolis city council
Jenkins announced in December 2016 that she would run to represent Minneapolis's 8th Ward on the City Council. Glidden, who held the seat, announced that she would not run for reelection. Jenkins’ campaign slogan was "Leadership. Access. Equity." With Hayden Mora, Jenkins founded Trans United Fund, a political action committee (PAC) to aid transgender candidates. On November 7, 2017, Jenkins won the election with more than 70% of the vote. The Minneapolis City Council has only had six other Black members. During the 2017 election, three Black council members won their races. She was elected vice president of City Council by her fellow councilors shortly after her election. Since then, she has also served as chair of the new Race Equity Subcommittee and helped create a Racial Equity Community Advisory Committee consisting of city residents.

The 8th Ward that Jenkins represents includes the 38th Street and Chicago Avenue intersection where George Floyd was murdered by a Minneapolis police officer on May 25, 2020. Despite initially supporting abolishment of the Minneapolis Police Department following the murder of George Floyd, Jenkins later decided, following a recent wave of shooting, that the police should and keep doing their work in the city. But she also said Minneapolis "should focus on creating more schools, housing and other services that prevent people from pursuing crime or turning to violence".

Jenkins was reelected to the Minneapolis City Council in November 2021, and was named City Council President on January 10, 2022, in a unanimous vote.

Vehicle blocking incident
On June 27, 2021, Jenkins, the vice president of the Minneapolis City Council, was involved in a confrontation with racial justice activists at a Pride event in downtown Minneapolis. A group that included Donald Hooker Jr, a leader with Twin Cities Coalition for Justice 4 Jamar (referring to Jamar Clark), blocked the car Jenkins was a passenger in for several hours and presented a list of six demands that Jenkins was asked to sign her agreement to. The demands including dropping charges against protesters in recent demonstrations, calling for the immediate resignation of Minneapolis Mayor Jacob Frey, continuing the closure of George Floyd Square, and providing more information about investigations of recent police killings. After Jenkins signed the agreement, activists moved out of the way to allow the vehicle to drive away. Hooker posted a 23-minute video of part of the encounter to Facebook. In a statement about the incident, Jenkins said she was treated inhumanely and held against her will by the demonstrators. The editorial board of the Star Tribune newspaper criticized what is described as attempted intimidation of Jenkins and compared aspects of the blocking incident to the 2021 United States Capitol attack.

Media recognition 
In 2010, Jenkins won the Naked Stages grant from the Jerome Foundation and Pillsbury House Theater. She created "Body Parts: Reflections on Reflections".

Jenkins was one of several dozen women featured on the January 29, 2018, Time cover. The article was about the many women who ran for office in 2017 and 2018. Five of the women featured were lesbian and transgender candidates, all recipients of money from the LGBTQ Victory Fund.

In June 2020, in honor of the 50th anniversary of the first LGBTQ pride parade, Queerty named her among the fifty heroes "leading the nation toward equality, acceptance, and dignity for all people". She was included in the 2022 Fast Company Queer 50 list.

Personal life
Jenkins is a performance artist, poet, and writer who identifies as bisexual and queer. She is a grandmother. Her own mother now lives in Ward 8. She has a partner of eight years. Jenkins was diagnosed with multiple sclerosis in 2018.

She has participated in the Trans Lives Matter movement and chaired the board of Intermedia Arts. In 2015, Jenkins was grand marshal of the Twin Cities Pride Parade. Jenkins has cited Barack Obama, Harold Washington, the Black Panther Party, Jeremiah Wright, and Jesse Jackson as having influenced her to be involved with politics.

Bibliography

See also 
 2020–2021 Minneapolis–Saint Paul racial unrest
Police abolition movement in Minneapolis

References

External links

 
 Andrea Jenkins on Intermedia Arts' website
 Andrea Jenkins on the Places Journal website

1961 births
Living people
African-American city council members in Minnesota
American curators
American women curators
Hamline University alumni
LGBT African Americans
American LGBT city council members
LGBT people from Illinois
LGBT people from Minnesota
Metropolitan State University alumni
Minneapolis City Council members
Minnesota Democrats
Poets from Minnesota
Southern New Hampshire University alumni
Transgender artists
Transgender politicians
Transgender women
American transgender writers
University of Minnesota alumni
Writers from Chicago
Writers from Minneapolis
Bisexual women
Bisexual politicians
Bisexual rights activists
American bisexual writers
21st-century American poets
Artists from Minneapolis
Politicians from Chicago
Women city councillors in Minnesota
21st-century American politicians
21st-century American women politicians
21st-century African-American women writers
21st-century American women writers
21st-century African-American writers
20th-century African-American people
21st-century LGBT people
20th-century African-American women
Robert Lindblom Math & Science Academy alumni